Events in the year 2023 in Macau, China.

Incumbents 

 Chief Executive: Ho Iat Seng
 President of the Legislative Assembly: Kou Hoi In

Deaths 

 11 January – Doming Lam, 96, Macanese-born Hong Kong classical composer.

References 

 
Years of the 21st century in Macau
Macau
Macau
2020s in Macau